52nd Street station is an elevated stop on the Market-Frankford Line, above the intersection of 52nd Street and Market Street in Philadelphia, Pennsylvania.  The station lies at the junction of four neighborhoods. Haddington is to the northwest, Dunlap to the northeast, Walnut Hill to the southeast, and Cobbs Creek to the southwest.

The SEPTA bus routes serving 52nd Street are routes 31 and 52. 52nd Street is a major shopping corridor in West Philadelphia.

History

From October 2006 to February 2008, the station underwent a rehabilitation project as part of a multi-phase reconstruction of the entire western Market Street Elevated. The renovated station included new elevators, escalators, lighting, and other infrastructure, as well as a new brick station house. Unlike other stations in the project, 52nd Street was never closed for an extended period of time. The project resulted in the station becoming compliant with the Americans with Disabilities Act.

In April 2007, the Philadelphia Police Department labeled this intersection the "Worst Corner In The City" due to the high crime and rate of shootings on the block. There were 16 shootings within a 4-month span beginning in June 2006.

Station layout
There are two side platforms connecting to a station house on the southeast corner of 52nd and Market streets. Two exit-only stairs descend to the west side of 52nd Street.

References

External links
 

 Station house from Google Maps Street View
 Images at NYCSubway.org

SEPTA Market-Frankford Line stations
Railway stations in Philadelphia
Railway stations in the United States opened in 1907
1907 establishments in Pennsylvania